Lucid Group, Inc. is an American electric vehicle manufacturer headquartered in Newark, California. The company was founded in 2007. Deliveries of the Dream Edition launch versions were made available to the first group of 520 reservation holders on October 30, 2021.

History

Lucid was founded in 2007 under the name Atieva and originally focused on building electric vehicle batteries and powertrains for other vehicle manufacturers.

Lucid's CEO and CTO, Peter Rawlinson, formerly served as VP of Engineering and Chief Engineer of the Model S at Tesla, Inc., and Vice President Derek Jenkins previously worked as Head of Design at Mazda North American Operations. The company has seen investments from Tsing Capital, Mitsui, Venrock, JAFCO, and others.

The company rebranded to Lucid Motors in October 2016 and officially announced its intent to develop an all-electric, high-performance luxury vehicle.

On November 29, 2016, state and company officials announced the planned construction of Lucid's US$700 million manufacturing plant in Casa Grande, Arizona, which was projected to employ up to 2,000 workers by the mid-2020s, initially building 20,000 cars and expanding up to 130,000 cars per year. The factory was then to be designed to support a maximum capacity of 380,000 cars per year. , the company had planned to break ground in 2017, and have cars in production by early 2019. The first vehicles began rolling off the assembly line on September 28, 2021.

On September 17, 2018, Lucid Motors announced that they were in talks with the Public Investment Fund, which is the Saudi Arabian sovereign investment fund, for funding valued at over US$1 billion. The investment was completed in April 2019. The investment will fund: the final engineering and testing of the Lucid Air model; the first-phase construction of its manufacturing plant in Casa Grande, Arizona; the commercial production of the Lucid Air; and Lucid's worldwide retail strategy, beginning in North America. Construction of the plant began in late 2019, the first-phase was completed in December 2020. The second-phase construction is ongoing and will increase production capacity from 34,000 to 90,000 vehicles a year. The completed factory (4 phases) will have a combined manufacturing capacity of about 400,000 cars per year.

In February 2021, Lucid Motors announced a deal valued at US$11.75 billion to merge with Churchill Capital Corp IV, a publicly traded special-purpose acquisition company (SPAC). CEO Rawlinson announced Lucid's intention to produce its Project Gravity SUV by 2023, then offer a competitor to Tesla's Model 3 by 2024 or 2025.

In July 2021, The Wall Street Journal reported that the Public Investment Fund will own over 60 percent of Lucid when the company goes public. The fund will record a profit of nearly US$20 billion from its investment in Lucid in 2018.

Lucid began building its first all-electric Air sedans in Arizona in September 2021 and started delivering them to customers in late October.
Lucid produced 7,180 vehicles in 2022 after decreasing its 2022 production outlook from 20,000 vehicles to 12,000–14,000 vehicles on 
February 28, 2022, citing supply chain issues, and again to 6,000–7,000 vehicles when it released its Q2 financial results on August 3, 2022

Vehicles
 
Lucid mainly developed battery technology in its early years, but began development of its first car in 2014.

Development prototype
The company initially used a Mercedes Metris van named "Edna", to develop the powertrain.

Lucid Air 

A prototype of the Lucid Air fully electric car was unveiled in December 2016. Lucid Air production was expected to start in spring 2021. The full range of models includes Lucid Air Touring, Grand Touring, and Dream Edition versions.

On September 16, 2020, the US Environmental Protection Agency (EPA) rated the range of the Lucid Air to be  on a single charge.

Lucid has agreed with Mobileye to use their EyeQ4 chips and eight cameras for driver assist features, and will make the car "autonomous ready". In July 2017, running on the high-speed track at the Transportation Research Center in Ohio, a special version of the car (with the speed limiter disabled via software and other modifications) hit .

Lucid is collaborating with Amazon to build in compatibility with Amazon's Alexa voice assistant, allowing drivers to use the voice assistant for navigation, phone calls, media streaming, smart home control, and other activities while driving.

The infotainment system is based on Android Automotive.

A Lucid Air is used by the character of Samantha Margolis in several episodes of season four of the Amazon Studios TV series Goliath.

In September 2021, Lucid released the EPA estimated range for both the Dream Edition Air and Air Grand Touring; the Dream Air had a range of 520 miles on a single charge while the Grand Touring offered 516 miles, making the Dream the longest range of any EV rated by the EPA and the Grand Touring the first to top 400 miles in a test drive.

Lucid Motors unveiled its 2022 Lucid Air Grand Touring model in November 2021.

On May 5, 2022, Lucid announced that it was raising prices of the variants of its luxury Air sedan, beginning June 1, 2022. The price hikes were expected to push the base price of the Air sedan up as much as 13%.

Lucid Air was named Motor Trend’s 2022 Car of the Year, being the first time a brand new car model won the award.

Project Gravity 

Lucid teased an electric SUV concept in September 2020 called Project Gravity with only a brief image and short video segment. Additional details were found in the patents that Lucid filed for the Gravity. The patents show that the Gravity features sleek headlamps similar to those of the Lucid Air as well as a visibly short hood and a large windscreen. In addition, the patents show that the side of the vehicle has a horizontal beltline as well as a sleek, wide windows, and quarter glass panels.

Batteries
The Lucid Air will debut with a 900V+ electrical architecture, and custom lithium-ion battery cells. Lucid's car uses the 2170 standard for its lithium-ion battery cells, and supply agreements have been signed with both Samsung SDI and LG Chem.

Lucid designs, develops, manufactures, and supplies battery packs for gen2 Formula E race teams beginning in the 2018-2019 season through the 2021-2022 racing season, in collaboration with McLaren Applied Technologies and Sony.

Charging
Lucid Motors partnered with Electrify America to use their nationwide charging network as an option for recharging Lucid's electric vehicles on the road. The Lucid Air will be able to add  in 20 minutes when using the station's 350 kW charging capability.

Manufacturing facilities 
In December 2019, Lucid broke ground on a factory in Casa Grande, Arizona, the first greenfield facility for EV manufacturing in the United States. On December 1, 2020, Lucid completed factory construction, dubbed AMP-1, and "aims to ramp up to 400,000 electric cars per year."

The US$700 million facility was expected to begin producing the Lucid Air by spring 2021. The initial phase includes an initial . Phase 2 of construction was expected to begin in early 2021. The land upon which this facility is built is owned by Pinal County, Arizona, who leases the  plot to Lucid. The land was bought by Pinal County for $29.94 million, which was financed by issuing bonds.

On February 28, 2022, Lucid announced a long-term plan to build a new manufacturing plant in Saudi Arabia with the capability of producing 150,000 vehicles per year. Lucid has partnered with the Ministry of Investment of Saudi Arabia (MISA), The Saudi Industrial Development Fund (SIDF), and the King Abdullah Economic City (KAEC).

Saudi Arabia 
On, 27 April 2022, Government of Saudi Arabia announced to purchase a minimum of 50,000 electric vehicles and up to 100,000 electric vehicles from Lucid Motors over a ten-year period. The Saudi government said the decision was in line with efforts to make its fleet more environmentally friendly and diversify the national economy away from oil. Lucid was selected, the government said, because the company is setting up a full production factory in Saudi Arabia—its first international manufacturing plant, which is aiming to produce 150,000 cars annually.

See also
 Electric vehicle motor
 List of automobile manufacturers of the United States
 List of production battery electric vehicles
 Plug-in electric vehicles in the United States

References

External links 
 

2007 establishments in California
Battery electric vehicle manufacturers
Car brands
Car manufacturers of the United States
Companies based in Newark, California
Electric vehicle manufacturers of the United States
Luxury motor vehicle manufacturers
Manufacturing companies based in the San Francisco Bay Area
Motor vehicle manufacturers based in California
Vehicle manufacturing companies established in 2007
Special-purpose acquisition companies
Public Investment Fund
American companies established in 2007